XPLM (formerly xPLM Solution GmbH) is an international computer software company specializing in the integration of various development applications with product lifecycle management (PLM) systems. The company was founded as xPLM Solution GmbH in 2005 in Dresden, Germany. Today XPLM is one of the leading integration providers for product development systems. Besides offices in Germany XPLM maintains subsidiaries in Switzerland and the United States.

References

External links 
 

Software companies of Germany